The UK Rock & Metal Singles Chart is a record chart which ranks the best-selling rock and heavy metal songs in the United Kingdom. Compiled and published by the Official Charts Company, the data is based on each track's weekly physical sales, digital downloads and streams. In 1999, there were 14 singles that topped the 52 published charts. The first number-one of the year was Resurrection, an extended play by American industrial metal band Fear Factory, which spent the last two weeks of 1998 and the first week of 1999 at number one. The final number-one single of the year was "She's Got Issues" by American pop punk band The Offspring.

The most successful song on the UK Rock & Metal Singles Chart in 1999 was "Why Don't You Get a Job?" by The Offspring, which spent a total of eleven weeks at number one. The band also topped the chart for four weeks with "She's Got Issues". "Why Does It Always Rain on Me?" by Travis spent ten weeks at number one, while "November Rain" by Guns N' Roses was number one for six weeks over two three-week spells. Def Leppard were number one for five weeks in 1999 with "Promises" (three weeks) and "Goodbye" (two weeks); Skunk Anansie's "Charlie Big Potato" and Rage Against the Machine's "Guerrilla Radio" spent four weeks each at number one; Bon Jovi's "Real Life" was number one for three weeks; and Metallica spent three weeks at number one with "The Unforgiven II" (one week) and "Whiskey in the Jar" (two weeks).

Chart history

See also 
1999 in British music
List of UK Rock & Metal Albums Chart number ones of 1999

References

External links 
Official UK Rock & Metal Singles Chart Top 40 at the Official Charts Company
The Official UK Top 40 Rock Singles at BBC Radio 1

1999 in British music
United Kingdom Rock und Metal Singles
1999